Shoaib Sarwar (born 15 October 1986) is a United Arab Emirates cricketer. A right-handed batsman and right-arm medium-fast bowler, he has played for the United Arab Emirates national cricket team since 2006, including eight first-class and nine List A matches.

Biography

Born in Dubai in 1986, Shoaib Sarwar first played for the UAE at Under-19 level, playing in the Youth Asia Cup in Karachi in 2003 and in the ACC Under-19 Cup in Nepal in 2005. He first played for the senior side in 2006, making his List A debut with matches against Ireland and Sri Lanka A in the EurAsia Cricket Series in Abu Dhabi. He also played against Brunei and Saudi Arabia in that year's ACC Trophy.

He made his first-class debut in February 2008, playing an ICC Intercontinental Cup match against Kenya. He scored 61 in the second innings of that match, his highest first-class score. He has since played matches in the tournament against Ireland and the Netherlands as well as a match against Essex County Cricket Club. He most recently represented his country in the ACC Trophy Elite tournament in Kuala Lumpur.

References

     8.   Shoaib Sarwar at The National U.A.E 

1986 births
Living people
People from the Emirate of Sharjah
Emirati cricketers